The Rolling stock of the Keighley & Worth Valley Railway is used on the preserved Keighley & Worth Valley Railway, a  branch line that served mills and villages in the Worth Valley and is now a heritage railway line in West Yorkshire, England. It runs from Keighley to Oxenhope. It connects to the national rail network line at Keighley railway station.

Steam locomotives

Operational

Currently elsewhere

Undergoing overhaul

Stored, static or on display

Former Worth Valley Residents

Diesel locomotives and Multiple Units

Operational

Out of service

References

External links 

  Keighley and Worth Valley Railway website
 Ingrow Museum of Rail Travel – Vintage Carriages Trust
 Ingrow Loco Museum – Bahamas Locomotive Society
  British Railways in 1960 – Keighley to Oxenhope
  Lancashire & Yorkshire Railway Trust website

Keighley and Worth Valley Railway